Maxime is a 1958 French comedy-drama film directed by Henri Verneuil who co-wrote screenplay with Henri Jeanson and Albert Valentin. It based on novel by Henri Duvernois. The film stars Michèle Morgan, Charles Boyer, Arletty and Jane Marken.

It tells the story of an ageing roue, a rich man and a lovely woman.

Cast
Charles Boyer as Maxime Cherpray
Michèle Morgan as Jacqueline Monneron
Arletty as Gazelle
Jane Marken as Coco Naval
Félix Marten as Hubert Treffujean
Jacques Dufilho as Flick
Micheline Luccioni as Liliane

External links

Films directed by Henri Verneuil
French comedy-drama films
1958 films
1950s French films